Igor Marić (born August 15, 1982 in Split) is a Croatian bobsledder who has competed since 2008. At the 2010 Winter Olympics in Vancouver, he finished 20th in the four-man event.

Marić's best finish is sixth in a lesser event in Calgary in December 2009.

References

External links
 

1982 births
Bobsledders at the 2010 Winter Olympics
Croatian male bobsledders
Living people
Olympic bobsledders of Croatia
Sportspeople from Split, Croatia
21st-century Croatian people